José Victor de Souza dos Santos (born 8 March 1990), commonly known as Zé Victor, is a Brazilian footballer who currently plays as a midfielder.

Career statistics

Club

Notes

References

External links
 

1990 births
Living people
Brazilian footballers
Brazilian expatriate footballers
Association football forwards
Agremiação Sportiva Arapiraquense players
Rio Branco Sport Club players
Lee Man FC players
Hoi King SA players
Campeonato Brasileiro Série B players
Hong Kong Premier League players
Brazilian expatriate sportspeople in Hong Kong
Expatriate footballers in Hong Kong